Bondebladet was a Norwegian newspaper published in Voss and Bergen in Hordaland county.

History and profile
Bondebladet was started on 4 March 1914 as an organ for farmers. The paper also supported Landsmål. Already in June 1915 it absorbed Vestlandsbonden. It was first published weekly, then from 1919 three days a week. It was a local newspaper with special care for farmers, but became a regional newspaper in 1921 and a newspaper for the whole Western Norway in 1922. At the same time it was moved to Bergen, became a daily newspaper, and became affiliated with the newly founded Agrarian Party. It did not cope with its own ambitious goals, and went defunct after its last issue on 6 December 1935.

References

1914 establishments in Norway
1935 disestablishments in Norway
Centre Party (Norway) newspapers
Defunct newspapers published in Norway
Mass media in Voss
Newspapers published in Bergen
Norwegian-language newspapers
Nynorsk
Publications established in 1914
Publications disestablished in 1935